Xiangfen County is a county in the southwest of Shanxi Province, China. It was established in February 1954 from the merger of the former Xiangling County and Fencheng County.

Taosi archeological site is in Xiangfen County.

Administrative divisions
Xiangfen County has jurisdiction over seven towns and six townships. These towns and townships are then further divided into 6 neighborhood committees, and 348 village committees.

Climate

Economy 
The county has vast mineral deposits, including 2.8 billion tons of proven coal reserves, 371 million tons of gypsum, and 30 million tons of iron ore. Other mined resources include dolomite, gold, silver, and copper.

The county's heavy industries produce a number of industrial resources, such as coal coke, chemicals, steel, cement, and cast iron. Other more complex goods such as auto parts, fitness equipment, and industrial sewing machines are also produced in Xiangfen County.

Transportation

Road 
The G5 Beijing–Kunming Expressway and the G22 Qingdao–Lanzhou Expressway run through the county.

Rail 
The Datong–Puzhou railway and the Datong–Xi'an passenger railway run through the county.

See also
Dingcun, Xincheng
1695 Linfen earthquake

References

County-level divisions of Shanxi